Steinbach is an Ortsgemeinde – a municipality belonging to a Verbandsgemeinde, a kind of collective municipality – in the Rhein-Hunsrück-Kreis (district) in Rhineland-Palatinate, Germany. It belongs to the Verbandsgemeinde Simmern-Rheinböllen, whose seat is in Simmern.

Geography

Location
The municipality lies in the Hunsrück on the northwest slope of the Simmerbach valley, roughly 8 km northeast of Simmern and 7 km northwest of Rheinböllen. Steinbach's municipal area measures 2.60 km², of which 0.91 km² is wooded.

History
Beginning in 1794, Steinbach lay under French rule. In 1814 it was assigned to the Kingdom of Prussia at the Congress of Vienna. Since 1946, it has been part of the then newly founded state of Rhineland-Palatinate.

Population development
What follows is a table of the municipality's population figures for selected years since the early 19th century (each time at 31 December):

Politics

Municipal council
The council is made up of 6 council members, who were elected by majority vote at the municipal election held on 7 June 2009, and the honorary mayor as chairman.

Mayor
Steinbach's mayor is Michael Schubach.

References

External links

Steinbach at Hunsrück und Naheland 
Brief portrait of Steinbach with film at SWR Fernsehen 

Rhein-Hunsrück-Kreis